Agonum decorum is a species of ground beetle in the Platyninae family, that prefers to live near the waters of North America.

Distribution
It is very widespread in North America (Canada, United States, Mexico), and the Caribbean. It can also be found on Cuba.

References

External links
Images

decorum
Beetles described in 1823
Beetles of North America